"Kid" is a song written by Chrissie Hynde that was released on the Pretenders 1980 debut album Pretenders. Hynde wrote the song about a fictional boy discovering that his mother is a prostitute. The song's melodicism was attributed by guitarist James Honeyman-Scott to Hynde's growing interest in pop music. Honeyman-Scott wrote the song's solo, which he had designed over a couple of days.

"Kid" was released as a single and reached number 33 in the UK. It has been covered by several other artists, including Everything but the Girl.

Background
Of the lyrics to "Kid," Hynde stated, "It's about a prostitute whose son finds out what she does for a living and this is her having a conversation with him. Not all songs are autobiographical."

Guitarist James Honeyman-Scott attributed the song's melodic quality to Hynde's shift from punk to pop; he explained, "Chrissie started to like pop music, and that’s why she started writing things like 'Kid. Honeyman-Scott also assisted in arranging the song and composed the guitar solo. Drummer Martin Chambers said of Honeyman-Scott's solo:

Johnny Marr of the Smiths, who cited Honeyman-Scott as an influence, often used "Kid" as a warm-up song before gigs.

Music and lyrics
Author Alex Ogg describes "Kid" as a "resonant ballad." The lyrics express the singer's devotion to the listener, who may be her child, but could also be her lover or just a friend.  Allmusic critic Stewart Mason calls it "an all-time classic rock and roll love song" and "probably the [Pretenders'] masterpiece."  He particularly praises Hynde's "beautiful and emotional" lead vocals, and James Honeyman-Scott's lead guitar playing, which he says sounds like the Byrds at times but also sounds tougher when necessary.

Record World said that "Chrissie bares her heart and soul with a priceless vocal performance" and that "sharp, guitar icing covers the love song with riffs and rhythm rings while the pace maintains a medium rock tempo, but the feel is pure ballad."

Allmusic critic Stephen Thomas Erlewine praised how Honeyman-Scott's "unconventional" playing adds additional dimensions to the "measured pop" of "Kid". Author Jeremy Simmonds said of "Kid" that it "showed the group's complete mastery of sixties hooks with sharp. confident new wave leanings."  Rolling Stone Album Guide critic J.D. Considine praises how melody expresses "emotional vulnerability."  Considine also praises how the band adds "soul" to the song's "sentimentality."  According to Mason, the Pretenders' later single "Show Me" was partially a rewrite of "Kid."

Ultimate Classic Rock critic Bryan Wawzenek rated it one of drummer Martin Chambers' 5th best Pretenders songs, saying that Chambers "just soars to the bridge, where he gets to flash a little muscle. And then he steals a few stutter beats from the Ronettes to let 'Kid' wander down girl-group lane."

Release
"Kid" was released as the Pretenders' second single in 1979, prior to the release of their debut album, following "Stop Your Sobbing."  It performed slightly better on the UK charts than "Stop Your Sobbing," reaching number 33 whereas "Stop Your Sobbing" reached number 34.  However, the band's follow up single "Brass in Pocket" performed even better, reaching #1.

The song's single release was accompanied by a music video, which featured the band at an amusement park.

Since its original release, "Kid" has appeared on a number of Pretenders' compilation albums. including The Singles and Greatest Hits.  It also appears on the live album The Isle of View, in which Hynde is backed by a string quartet, in what Stephen Thomas Erlewine describes as a "poorly conceived" version.

Charts

Cover versions
Everything but the Girl covered "Kid" on the US version of their 1985 album Love Not Money, with Tracey Thorn playing piano and singing solo vocal.  Allmusic's Mason praised this as the best cover version of "Kid."  However, fellow Allmusic critic William Ruhlmann claimed that adding the song to the US version did not enhance the album's appeal.

Matthew Sweet and Susanna Hoffs covered "Kid" on their 2013 album Under the Covers, Vol. 3.

References

1979 singles
1979 songs
The Pretenders songs
Song recordings produced by Chris Thomas (record producer)
Songs written by Chrissie Hynde
Sire Records singles
Everything but the Girl songs
Jangle pop songs